Vladimir Đilas (also transliterated Vladimir Djilas; born 3 March 1983) is a Serbian football forward who plays for Brodarac.

Club career
Born in Belgrade, Đilas started his career with Bežanija, where he played between 2001 and 2003. Later he spent the whole 2004 playing with BPI Pekar, before he joined Bregalnica Štip at the beginning of 2005. After a season-and-a-half playing with club, he moved to Bulgaria and Marek Dupnitsa where he stayed until the end of 2006. He also spent next two years at the same county playing with Lokomotiv Sofia. Returning in Serbia, Đilas joined Jagodina at the beginning of 2009, and stayed with club until the summer 2011, when he left to the Kazakhstan Premier League side Aktobe. During the time he spent with Jagodina, he had been scouted by Roma. At the beginning of 2013, Đilas moved to Voždovac from Ordabasy and stayed with as the club captain until the end of same year when he left the club. Later he played with Metalac Gornji Milanovac, Radnički Niš, Ergotelis, Panachaiki, and Borac Banja Luka until the summer 2016. In last days of the summer transfer window 2016, Đilas officially signed a one-year contract with Partizan, but stayed out of the first squad, training with Teleoptik until the winter break off-season. After he spent the winter break off-season with the first team, he was licensed for the spring half of the Serbian SuperLiga with jersey number 8. In summer 2017, Đilas extended his contract with Partizan for a year. On last day of the summer transfer window 2017, Đilas moved on six-month loan deal to Teleoptik.

Career statistics

Honours
Partizan
 Serbian SuperLiga: 2016–17
 Serbian Cup: 2016–17, 2017–18

References

External links
 
 
 
 
 Vladimir Đilas at Utakmica.rs 

1983 births
Living people
Footballers from Belgrade
Serbian footballers
Association football forwards
FK Bežanija players
PFC Marek Dupnitsa players
FC Lokomotiv 1929 Sofia players
FK Jagodina players
FK Voždovac players
FK Metalac Gornji Milanovac players
FK Radnički Niš players
FK Partizan players
FK Teleoptik players
Ergotelis F.C. players
FK Brodarac players
First Professional Football League (Bulgaria) players
Serbian First League players
Serbian SuperLiga players
Serbian expatriate sportspeople in Bulgaria
Expatriate footballers in Bulgaria
Expatriate footballers in North Macedonia